Setrock Creek Falls is a waterfall in the Pisgah National Forest, in North Carolina.

Geology
The falls is located at the base of Mount Mitchell, the tallest mountain in the United States east of the Mississippi River, on Setrock Creek, a small tributary of the South Toe River, which itself is a tributary of the Nolichucky River.  The creek falls over multiple steep to near-vertical sections of rock under a solid canopy of trees. It has low water flow which can slow to a mere trickle in dry weather.  The water clings to the rocks on its way down and ends in a nice pool at the bottom.

Height
There are some disputes as to the height of the falls.

Visiting the Falls
From the intersection of NC 80 and the Blue Ridge Parkway, go 2.2 miles north on NC 80 and turn left on South Toe River Road.  Passing the access to Roaring Fork Falls, go 2.19 miles to the fork, go right, and go 0.61 miles further to the Black Mountain Campground.  From the hiker parking area, enter the campground and take the drive furthest to the left, on Briar Bottom Road.  Just over 200 yards from the parking area, the drive crosses a small creek.  Take the trail on the left, pass the start of the Mount Mitchell Trail, cross Little Mountain Creek, take the right-hand path 200 yards to the falls.

Nearby Falls
Roaring Fork Falls
Mitchell Falls
Douglas Falls
Walker Falls
Crabtree Falls

References

External links
 Setrock Creek Falls on NCWaterfalls.com

Waterfalls of North Carolina
Protected areas of Yancey County, North Carolina
Pisgah National Forest
Waterfalls of Yancey County, North Carolina